Ambassador Sarafadeen Tunji Isola (born 25 November 1960) was appointed as the Nigerian High Commissioner to the United Kingdom by President Muhammadu Buhari in January 2021.

Early life and education 
Isola, fondly called "STI" was born in Abeokuta, Ogun State on November 25th, 1960 to the family of Egba High Chieftain, Alhaji Ibrahim Isola Tairu and Alhaja Amudalat Ajiun Isola (née Ejalonibu). He was a pupil at the Oke-Ona United Primary School, Ilugun, Abeokuta where he recorded academic excellence and was a member of the Drama Society. His secondary education was conducted at Nawair-ud-Deen Grammar School, Obantoko, Abeokuta. Upon completion of his secondary school education, young Isola began work as a sales clerk at Welcome Nigeria Limited (a pharmaceutical company). In his quest to develop himself further, Isola decided to travel to the United Kingdom for studies in 1978. He commenced training programmes at the Chartered Institute of Marketing, United Kingdom where he obtained a Diploma in Marketing from the institution. He partook in the Principles of Investment Course at the South West London College, Tooting Broadway, London, United Kingdom in 1981. Chief Isola "...decided to return to Nigeria out of sheer patriotism" in 1982. 

And in 1983, he proceeded for his compulsory national youth service (NYSC) in Kaduna State (current day Katsina state). During this period, he lectured at the Federal Advanced Teachers' College (FATC) - now Federal College of Education (FCE) Katsina - in various disciplines namely: Economics, Marketing, and Business Statistics.

In 1986, Mr. Isola joined the Ogun State Broadcasting Corporation (OGBC), Abeokuta as a Sales Executive. Chief Isola resigned his appointment from OGBC in 1990, because he sought to grow his business and entrepreneurial acumen. After which, he established Taist Nigeria Limited and Taist Merchants as Chairman/Chief Executive.

Public service 
Chairman, Abeokuta North Local Government  Chief Isola was elected Chairman, Abeokuta North Local Government in 1997. During his tenure, Isola was elected Chairman, Conference of Local Government Council Chairmen, Ogun State. His managerial exploits during his tenure won plaudits from the then Military Administrator (MILAD) of Ogun State, Group Captain Sam Ewang.  It was also during Chief Isola's chairmanship that Chief Moshood Kashimawo Olawale (MKO) Abiola died on 7 July, 1998. Of great consequence was Chief Isola's decision as chairman to house and spare the lives of 29 Northerners in the local government secretariat during the rancour, acrimony, and thirst for revenge that followed the announcement of Chief Abiola's death. Isola was a victim of verbal abuse and physical intimidation from among his constituents for his show of mercy. His brief tenure as chairman ended in 1998.
Special Assistant to the Honourable Minister (State), Finance  Following Nigeria's adoption of the Fourth Republic's constitution, and introduction to a fully democratic dispensation in 1999, Alhaji Isola was appointed the Special Assistant (SPA) to the Honourable Minister of State, Finance - the late Alhaji Jubril Martins Kuye (JMK) - under the reign of Chief Olusegun Obasanjo as president of the Federal Republic of Nigeria. It was during this period that he attended well over a score of international seminars and conferences across the globe. He gained thorough and formal tutelage on the financial system of the United States of America in 2002 organized by the Department of State, Washington, DC, U.S.A. Isola concluded his stint as special assistant with commendation in 2003.  Secretary to the State Government, Ogun State  Following the successful election of Chief Otunba Gbenga Daniel (OGD) as governor of Ogun State in 2003 under the banner of the People's Democratic Party (PDP), Alhaji Sarafa Tunji Isola was appointed the Secretary to the State Government by the incumbent governor. For Hajj 2004, Alhaji Sarafa Isola led the delegation of Ogun State, Nigeria to Saudi Arabia as Amir-Hajj of Ogun State Pilgrims and recorded success and received an award for the exercise. He completed his term as the State Government's Secretary with commendation from the state governor in 2007.  Honourable Minister, Mines and Steel Development  Chief Isola was appointed the Honourable Minister for Mines and Steel Development on 26 July, 2007 by the then president of the Federal Republic of Nigeria, the late Alhaji Umaru Musa Yar'Adua. As of August 2007, Isola asserted that Nigeria would soon become a leader in the production of coal and bitumen. In October of the same year, during a visit to the Federal Republic of Nigeria by the then Indian Prime Minister, Dr. Manmohan Singh, Mr. Isola met his counterpart T. Subbarami Reddy where they agreed to encourage Indian entrepreneurs in mining coal, gold, iron-ore, chrome-ore, lead, and other minerals. In June 2008, Mr. Isola received a delegation from the Chinese Mining Investment Company looking to partner in the development of seven (7) coal fields for electric power generation in Nigeria. After which, he said that a transparent and competitive process would be followed in the selection of companies for the project. On October 29, 2008, following a cabinet review by President Yar'Adua, Chief Isola was relieved of his duties as the Minister for Mines and Steel Development due to local politics.  The president released Isola from his role as Minister, albeit with commendation.  Alhaji Sarafadeen Isola did not deter in terms of his personal development following his exit from political office, he instead enrolled in a 'Leaders in Development' course in 2009 at the John F. Kennedy School of Government, Harvard Kennedy School, Harvard University, Cambridge, Massachusetts, U.S.A.  He enrolled for a Masters of Business Administration (MBA) degree at the University of Ilorin, Ilorin, Kwara State and was accorded the certificate in 2011.  High Commissioner to the United Kingdom  President Muhammadu Buhari nominated 41 non-career ambassadors-designate nominees for confirmation of appointment to the Senate of the Federal Republic of Nigeria on July 1, 2020. Chief Sarafa Tunji Isola was recommended for confirmation and hearing was conducted on July 22, 2020. After a delay of six months - owing to the shock and effect of the Covid-19 pandemic on global politics and dwindling revenues to the federal government - Isola was announced as the High Commissioner to the United Kingdom on January 13, 2021.

Professional bio 
 Lecturer (NYSC), Department of Business Studies, Federal College of Education, Katsina 1982 – 1983
 Lecturer in Business Statistics, Marketing and Economics at Federal College of Education, Katsina 1983 – 1986
 Sales Executive, Commercial Services Division Ogun State Broadcasting Corporation 1986 – 1990
 Executive Chairman, Taist Nigeria Ltd 1990 – 1998                                     
 Executive Chairman, 2008 – till date

o   Taist Nigeria Ltd

o   Taist Merchants

o   Eshawller Investment Ltd.

o   Platisol Investment Ltd. 2014 till date

References 

High Commissioners of Nigeria to the United Kingdom
1960 births
Living people
Politicians from Abeokuta
Harvard University alumni
University of Ilorin alumni
Government ministers of Nigeria